Tyana is a genus of moths of the family Nolidae. The genus was erected by Francis Walker in 1866.

Species
 Tyana callichlora Walker, 1866
 Tyana carneicilia Prout, 1928
 Tyana chloroleuca Walker, 1866
 Tyana elongata Warren, 1916
 Tyana falcata (Walker, 1866)
 Tyana flavitegulae Rothschild, 1920
 Tyana fuscitorna Draudt, 1950
 Tyana hoenei Draudt, 1950
 Tyana magniplaga Warren, 1916
 Tyana marina Warren, 1916
 Tyana monosticta Hampson, 1912
 Tyana ornata Wileman, 1910
 Tyana pustulifera (Walker, 1866)
 Tyana tenuimargo Druce, 1911

References

Chloephorinae